Kirill Anatolyevich Malyarov (born 7 March 1997) is a Russian football player who plays for Baltika Kaliningrad.

Club career
He made his professional debut in the Russian Football National League for FC Volga Nizhny Novgorod on 11 July 2015 in a game against FK Yenisey Krasnoyarsk.

On 27 January 2020, his contract with FC Rostov was terminated by mutual consent. He then spent the first half of 2020 in Belshina Bobruisk, before returning to Nizhny Novgorod in the summer.

Personal life
His older brother Nikita Malyarov is also a professional footballer.

References

External links
 
 Player page on the FNL website
 
 

1997 births
Russian Jews
Living people
Jewish footballers
Russian footballers
Russian expatriate footballers
Russia youth international footballers
Association football defenders
Footballers from Moscow
FC Volga Nizhny Novgorod players
FC Dynamo Moscow reserves players
FC Rotor Volgograd players
FC Nizhny Novgorod (2015) players
FC Rostov players
FC Belshina Bobruisk players
FC Shakhter Karagandy players
FC Baltika Kaliningrad players
Russian First League players
Russian Second League players
Belarusian Premier League players
Kazakhstan Premier League players
Russian expatriate sportspeople in Belarus
Russian expatriate sportspeople in Kazakhstan
Expatriate footballers in Belarus
Expatriate footballers in Kazakhstan